Wrightson is a surname, and may refer to
Bernard Wrightson, American olympic medalist
Bernie Wrightson, American comic book artist
Earl Wrightson, American singer and actor
Harry Wrightson, English conservative politician
Jeff Wrightson, English former footballer
Jane Wrightson, New Zealand's chief censor
John Wrightson, English agricultural pioneer 
Keith Wrightson, English historian 
Michele Wrightson, American artist
Paddy Wrightson, English footballer
Patricia Wrightson, Australian children's writer
Roger Wrightson, English cricketer
William Battie-Wrightson, English landowner, son of William Wrightson (MP for Aylesbury)
William Wrightson (MP for Aylesbury), English landowner, grandson of William Wrightson (MP, born 1676)
William Wrightson (MP, born 1676), English landowner, grandfather of William Wrightson (MP for Aylesbury)

It is also used as a first name, and may refer to
Wrightson Mundy, High Sheriff of Derbyshire in 1737 and MP for Leicestershire in 1747

It also is the name of a baronetcy.
Wrightson baronets
Sir Thomas Wrightson, 1st Baronet

It could also refer to
Head Wrightsons
Mount Wrightson
Wrightson Road

See also
Wright (surname)